Events from the year 1837 in art.

Events
January 20 – Death of the neo-classical architect Sir John Soane gives effect to the creation of his London house as Sir John Soane's Museum.
June 1 – The Government-funded Normal School of Design, predecessor of the Royal College of Art, begins classes at Somerset House in London.
June 10 – Galerie des Batailles at the Palace of Versailles in France, designed by Pierre-François-Léonard Fontaine with Frédéric Nepveu for the display of sculptures and historical paintings, is opened.
July – Edward Lear leaves Knowsley Hall in England to travel to Rome.
Art Union of London founded.
Marie Louise Élisabeth Vigée-Lebrun publishes the second volume of her memoirs.

Awards
Prix de Rome (for painting) – Thomas Couture
Knighthood – Augustus Wall Callcott

Works

Ditlev Blunck – Danske kunstnere på et romersk osteri ("Danish Artists at the Osteria la Gonsola, Rome")
David d'Angers – Philopoemen Wounded (sculpture)
Eugène Delacroix
murals in Salon du Roi, Chamber of Deputies of France, Palais Bourbon, Paris (completed)
Self-portrait
Benjamin Duterrau – portrait of Derrimut
William Dyce – Francesca da Rimini
William Etty – The Sirens and Ulysses
Caspar David Friedrich – Landscape with Owl, Grave, and Coffin
Edwin Landseer – The Old Shepherd's Chief Mourner
John Martin
Manfred and the Witch of the Alps
Manfred on the Jungfrau
Wijnand Nuijen – Shipwreck off a Rocky Coast
Juan Mauricio Rugendas – Battle of Maipú
Geskel Saloman – portrait of Smetana
Joseph von Führich – The Road to Emmaus Appearance
Sir David Wilkie
Josephine and the Fortune-Teller
Portrait of William IV

Births
 January – Daniel Cottier, Scottish artist and designer (died 1891)
January 1 – Adolf Mosengel, German landscape painter (died 1885)
January 27 – Tomioka Tessai, Japanese painter and calligrapher in Meiji period (died 1924)
February 12 – Thomas Moran, English-born American landscape painter of the Hudson River School (died 1926)
March 27 – John MacWhirter, Scottish landscape painter (died 1911)
April 10 – Tranquillo Cremona, Italian painter (died 1878)
May 8 – Alphonse Legros, French painter and etcher (died 1911)
June 8 – Ivan Kramskoi, Russian painter and art critic (died 1887)
July 4 – Carolus-Duran, French painter (died 1917)
December 18 – Ernest Hoschedé, French businessman and collector of Impressionist paintings (died 1891)

Deaths
 January 11 – Baron François Gérard, French painter (born 1770)
 January 29 – Andrew Plimer, British artist specialised in portrait miniatures (born 1763)
 February 8 – Ernst Willem Jan Bagelaar, Dutch engraver (born 1775)
 February 17 – Johann Baptist von Lampi the Younger, Austrian portrait painter (born 1775)
 February 27 – Françoise-Jeanne Ridderbosch, Belgian painter and engraver (born 1754)
 March 8 – Domingos Sequeira, Portuguese painter (born 1768)
 March 16 – François-Xavier Fabre, French painter of historical subjects (born 1766)
 March 31 – John Constable, English landscape painter (born 1776)
 May 18 – Marguerite Gérard, French painter and etcher (born 1761)
 August – Henry Behnes, English sculptor (born 1800
 August 9 – Xavier Sigalon, French painter (born 1787)
 September 18 – Pietro Fontana, Italian engraver (born 1762)
 December 28 – Boris Orlovsky, Russian sculptor (born 1793)
 date unknown
 Juliane Wilhelmine Bause, German landscape etcher (born 1768)
 Thomas Richmond, English miniature-painter (born 1771)
 Charles Henry Schwanfelder, English animal, landscape and portrait painter (born 1774)
 Yi Jaegwan, Korean genre works painter in the late Joseon period (born 1783)

References

 
Years of the 19th century in art
1830s in art